Justin Garcia may refer to:

 Justin Garcia (producer) (born 1993), American writer, animator and producer
 Justin Garcia (footballer) (born 1995), Trinidadian footballer